Váci NKSE are a Hungarian women's handball club from Vác, that play in the Nemzeti Bajnokság I. Founded in 1949, the team have won promotion to the top-level championship first in 1998. Since then, they have been improved year by year and achieved their best result in 2010 by finishing third. However, in 2011, the club's main sponsor stepped down, following which Vác had to cut their budget and lost many of their key players.

Crest, colours, supporters

Naming history
 –1996: Váci FORTE SC
1996–1997: Optotrans Vác
1997–2001: Synergon SE Vác
2001–2004: Váci NK
2004–2010: Váci NKSE
2010–2011: Syma-Váci NKSE
2011–2013: Váci NKSE
2013–2017: Ipress Center-Vác
2017–2019: GVM Europe-Vác
2019–2022: Váci NKSE
2022–: Praktiker-Vác

Kit manufacturers and Shirt sponsor
The following table shows in detail Váci NKSE kit manufacturers and shirt sponsors by year:

Kits

Team

Current squad
Squad for the 2022–23 season

 Head coach: Gábor Herbert
 Goalkeeping coach: Krisztina Szabó
 Fitness coach: Tamás Fazekas
 Masseur: Ágnes Sztranyan
 Physiotherapist: Dorottya Peszeki
 Doctor: Dr. Balogh Péter

 Chairman: Erika Kirsner
 Technical director: András Németh

Goalkeepers
 1  Fanni Csizmadia
 12  Bettina Pásztor
 16  Anna Bukovszky
RW
 19  Anna Pálffy
 28  Kíra Bánfai
 99  Nikolett Diószegi
LW
 4  Anna Ballai
 53  Natalie Schatzl
Line players
 6   Dorka Bencsik
 92  Jázmin Kovalcsik
 96  Fanny Helembai

Left backs
 23  Noémi Bárdy 
 24  Nikolett Marincsák
 18  Anikó Kovács
Centre backs
 44  Borbála Ballai
 59  Csenge Kuczora
 27  Aida Kurucz
Right backs
 5  Laura Kürthi 
 11  Fruzsina Ferenczy

Transfers
Transfers for the 2023–24 season

 Joining
  Luca Csíkos (LB) from  NEKA
  Fanni Csire (LW) from  Mosonmagyaróvári KC SE

 Leaving
  Bettina Pásztor (GK) 
  Natalie Schatzl (LW) to  Mosonmagyaróvári KC SE
  Diána Világos (LP) (to  Komárom VSE) (with immediate effect)
  Nikolett Diószegi (RW) (retires)
  Noémi Bárdy (LB) (retires)

Honours

Domestic competitions
Nemzeti Bajnokság I (National Championship of Hungary)
 Third place (1): 2009–10

Magyar Kupa (National Cup of Hungary)
 Bronze medal (2): 2002–03, 2011–12

European competitions
EHF Cup Winners' Cup:
Quarterfinalists: 2004

Recent seasons

Seasons in Nemzeti Bajnokság I: 26
Seasons in Nemzeti Bajnokság I/B: 8
Seasons in Nemzeti Bajnokság II: 27

In European competition
Vác score listed first. As of 19 February 2023.

Participations in EHF European League (EHF Cup): 9x
Participations in Cup Winners' Cup: 4x

Notable players 

  Auguszta Mátyás
  Blanka Bíró
  Ágnes Triffa
  Szandra Zácsik
  Kinga Klivinyi
  Viktória Soós
  Bernadett Temes
  Piroska Szamoránszky
  Krisztina Szádvári
  Szabina Tápai
  Ágnes Hornyák
  Annamária Ilyés
  Tímea Tóth
  Judit Veszeli
  Virág Vaszari
  Laura Szabó
  Rita Lakatos
  Orsolya Herr
  Edina Juhász
  Ildikó Lázár
  Ágnes Spargl
  Györgyi Sulyánszki
  Patricia Kovács
  Alexandra do Nascimento
  Karoline de Souza
  Barbara Arenhart
  Dijana Jovetić
  Sonja Bašić
  Ana Niksic
  Diana Pătru
  Kristina Liščević 
  Marija Stefanovic 
  Sanja Radosavljević 
  Sara Vukcevic 
  Sandra Nikcevic 
  Lucia Uhraková 
  Katarina Péntek-Dózsa 
  Ganna Siukalo 
  Marija Shteriova

Coaches 
  Dezső Sulyánszki
  László Fábián (1998-1999)
 Tibor Páll (1999-2002)
 János Hajdu (2002-2003, 2005)
 József Vura (2003-2005)
 Gusztáv Majoros (2005-2006)
 József Kenyeres (2006-2009)
 József Nyári (2009)
 András Németh (2009-2011)
 Csaba Ökrös (2011-2012)
 István Gulyás (2012-2013)
 Csaba Konkoly (2013-2014)
 Katalin Ottó (2014-2015, 2016, 2021-2022)
 Uros Bregar (2015-2016)
 Zoltán Szilágyi (2016-2021)
 Beáta Őze (2021)
 Gábor Herbert (2022-)

References

External links 
  

Vác's coaches

Hungarian handball clubs
Handball clubs established in 1949
1949 establishments in Hungary
Vác